Bohill Forest is a small coniferous forest located near Drumaness, Northern Ireland. It is managed by the  Forest Service Northern Ireland.

History

Bohill Forest Nature Reserve is a small area within the forest where trees had previously been felled and the land was allowed to naturally regrow. This woodland consists of holly, oak, rowan, birch, hazel and oak trees. Patches that are still clear of tree cover contain bracken, bilberry and heather. The habitat is ideal for the previously rare holly blue butterfly, which the nature reserve was set up to protect. Other fauna in the woodland includes the speckled wood butterfly, red deer, goldcrests, jays, chiffchaffs and blackcaps.

References

Forests and woodlands of Northern Ireland